Leumit Health Services (Leumit Sherutey Bri'ut, lit. National Health Care Services, formerly Kupat Holim Leumit, lit. National Sickness Fund) is an Israeli health insurance and medical services organization, founded in 1933 by the Revisionist Zionist Movement. As of 2020 it is the smallest of the four Kupot Holim (Israel's state-mandated health funds), and has over 700,000 members.

History

Kupat Holim Leumit  was established in 1933  by physicians who had been dismissed from their work in the General Health Fund (Clalit) following Arlosoroff's murder. Dr. Vinshal opened the first clinic at his home in Tel Aviv.

In 1940 the poet Uri Zvi Greenberg wrote that the fund's function was "to educate and cure."  Abba Ahimeir added: "The Jews must be taught to be healthy even when they are ill".

The uniqueness of the Leumit Health Fund lay in offering members the right to select the physician and medical service of their choice.

The fund's first manager, Mr. Melamedowitz, declared that the fund would be open to everyone and  patients would be treated as acquaintances, not numbers.

Today Leumit Leumit operates more than 300 medical centers and 100 pharmacies nationwide.

See also
Health care in Israel

References

External links

 

Health maintenance organizations
Medical and health organizations based in Israel
Organizations established in 1933
1933 establishments in Mandatory Palestine